The King of The Channel title is bestowed on the man who has successfully completed more swims of the English Channel than any other. The title as well the accompanied Letona Trophy is awarded by the Channel Swimming Association. The title is currently held by Kevin Murphy who has completed 34 swims between the years of 1968 and 2006. Chloë McCardel, with 44 crossings, has the designation as Queen of the Channel.

List of Kings of the Channel

References

External links
 Channel Swimming Association website

Swimming awards
 
Lists of swimmers